U.S. Route 70S (US 70S) is an alternative to U.S. Route 70 between the western part of Nashville and Sparta in Tennessee. It runs concurrent with US 70 for several blocks in downtown Nashville. The highway follows Murfreesboro Pike from Nashville to Murfreesboro then heads due east to McMinnville then northeast to Sparta where it ends at its junction with US 70. It was originally designated as U.S. Route 270 in 1926.

Route description
US 70S begins at a junction with US 70 and SR 24 as the Charlotte Pike, and runs concurrently with SR 1. The road descends to an interchange with I-40, before passing through the community of Bellevue and intersecting SR 251. After this, US 70S enters the urban Nashville area along Harding Pike, intersecting SR 100 and then crossing I-440 as West End Avenue. US 70S and SR 1 merge with US 431 and SR 106 and crosses the I-40 and I-65 freeway as Broadway. At that interchange, the one-way couplet of US 70 and SR 24 meets US 70S, and all these routes continue into downtown Nashville. At the intersection of Rosa Parks Boulevard and Broadway, US 31 and US 41 run concurrently with the other routes on 8th Avenue South and then Lafayette Street, while US 431 splits off with US 31 and US 41 headed north, and US 70 and SR 24 continue east. US 31 eventually continues south, splitting from the other routes. US 70S and SR 1 and US 41 come to an interchange with I-24 near the I-40 interchange, before the three routes leave the Nashville area as Murfreesboro Pike, intersecting SR 155 and passing under the runways of Nashville International Airport.

East of the airport, US 70S intersects SR 255, Donelson Pike, and later SR 254 as well as SR 171 (Hobson Pike), as it passes through the suburbs east of Nashville. In Rutherford County, US 70S has an interchange with SR 266 near the airport before passing through Smyrna. The highway then has an interchange with Lee Victory Parkway (SR 102) and I-840 before briefly paralleling the west fork of the Stones River and entering the city of Murfreesboro. U.S. Route 231 and SR 10 briefly run concurrently with the route, and SR 96 intersects it. Southeast of town, US 41 and SR 2 continue south, splitting off from SR 1 and US 70S. As Dr. Martin Luther King Jr. Boulevard, and then as the John Bragg Highway, the two routes leave the city and continue east through forested areas and farmland for several miles.

In the town of Woodbury, the highway intersects with SR 145, and passes through the town as Main Street, also briefly running concurrently with SR 53. The road then winds through foothills before intersecting SR 281, SR 146 (both in the Bluewing community), and SR 287 (in the town of Centertown). Main Street comes to an interchange with SR 380 and SR 55, and US 70S and SR 1 continue northeast on the Bobby Ray Memorial Parkway. The parkway continues along the outskirts of McMinnville, intersecting SR 56 and SR 380. As Sparta Highway, the routes continue east, intersecting SR 30 and SR 288 before passing near Campaign and becoming first Bone Cave Parkway and then Memorial Highway. After several miles, the routes run concurrently with SR 111 before heading due north on Spencer Highway before SR 1 exits from the divided highway. US 70S and SR 111 continue north to the diamond interchange with US 70 and SR 26 just west of downtown Sparta.

History

Route improvements
During the 1980s, the section of the route between Belle Meade and Smyrna was upgraded from two to four lanes.

In 1991, the portion from Smyrna to Murfreesboro was also upgraded to four lanes.

In the early 1990s, the  stretch from Murfreesboro to Woodbury was widened from two to four lanes.

Between 1994 and 2002, the section between McMinnville and Sparta was widened to four lanes and a four lane bypass around McMinnville was built. The former routing through downtown McMinnville is now designated State Route 380.

In 2006, besides the two-mile (3.2 km) western terminus near Bellevue past Interstate 40 to the intersection with US 70, the only section of US 70S that lacked four lanes was between Woodbury and McMinnville. Construction began outside McMinnville on widening to five lanes (including one left turn lane) for three miles (5 km) as a way to avoid congestion. 

In 2018, most of the section between McMinnville and Woodbury had been upgraded to a four-lane divided highway. From McMinnville west to where the road starts up the ridge is four-laned. The stretch of highway going through Woodbury proper is still two-lanes. As the remaining two-lane portion will be adjacent to the site chosen in late January 2017 by the Metropolitan Nashville-Davidson County Board of Education for the relocation of Hillwood High School, this may also be upgraded.

Junction list

See also

U.S. Route 70N

References

External links

70 S
70 S
S
Tennessee State Route 1 
Transportation in Nashville, Tennessee
Transportation in Davidson County, Tennessee
Transportation in Rutherford County, Tennessee
Transportation in Cannon County, Tennessee
Transportation in Warren County, Tennessee
Transportation in Van Buren County, Tennessee
Transportation in White County, Tennessee